The Marshall Independent is an American, English language newspaper headquartered in Marshall, Lyon County, Minnesota.  It is published Monday thru Saturday and is owned by Ogden Newspapers.   It has been called the Independent since 1974.  The newspaper was originally founded in 1875 and called The Prairie Schooner.  The newspaper includes a supplement called the Southwestern Peach.

History

The Marshall Independent traces its history back to shortly after the formation of Lyon County in 1878 and it has had the following names:
 Messenger Independent (1973-1974)
 Lyon County independent  (1932-1973)
 Messenger (1973-1973)
 Marshall Messenger (1961-1973)
 The Marshall Daily Messenger (1955-1961)
 The Marshall Messenger (1942-1955)
 Marshall Daily Messenger (1932-1942)
 The News Messenger of Lyon County (1885-1932)
 The Farmers Reporter (1918-1921)
 Lyon County Mews (1879-1885)
 Marshall Messenger (1875-1885)
 The Prairie Schooner (1873-1875)

The Marshall Independent has a website and Facebook presence for distribution of news and interacting with readers.

The newspaper covers local, Minnesota, national, and international news. Other sections of the newspaper include business news, crime reports, agriculture and extension news, public notices, and featured articles.  In 2019, the newspaper had a daily circulation of 4,321, which ranks 17th of the newspaper in Minnesota publishing at least five days a week.

References

Newspapers published in Minnesota
Lyon County, Minnesota